The World Muscle Power Classic (WMPC) (sometimes known as the World Muscle Power Championships) was one of the most enduring annual strongmen competitions, running for twenty years and in that time attaining the position of the second most prestigious strongman contest in the world, after the World's Strongest Man. It was notable for that reason and for the quality of the strength athletes it attracted, which included every winner of the World's Strongest Man competition from 1980 onwards including Jón Páll Sigmarsson, Geoff Capes and Bill Kazmaier from the 1980s right up to the five time WSM champion Mariusz Pudzianowski and four time WSM champion Žydrūnas Savickas, both of whom were never able to capture the WMPC title.

History
The World Muscle Power Classic (WMPC) first took place in 1985, with the by then established World's Strongest Man having made the popularity of strongman competitions such that this second world title was viable. In a sport notorious for the difficulty with which organisers are faced in making an event enduring, the WMPC stood side by side with the World's Strongest Man for almost twenty years and in that time saw many other events come and go. From the outset it attracted the very best athletes in the field and the final placings in that inaugural 1985 competition saw Jón Páll Sigmarsson, Geoff Capes and Bill Kazmaier on the podium, all previous winners of the World's Strongest Man and who between them won that title nine times. The event was organized and produced by Doug Edmunds and later the Reeves brothers. For its inception until 2002, the event was held in Scotland, home of the Highland Games, which has a claim to be the progenitor of strength athletics. The quality of the entrants continued unabated, attracting the very best in the world, and the competition quickly became regarded as the second most prestigious title after World's Strongest Man.

The events twentieth century years saw it have a distinctly Highland Games touch. In 1998 for example, there was an opening ceremony started with a parade and several bag pipe bands played as the "World Highland Games Competitors" and the "World Muscle Power Classic Competitors" entered the field together. The competitors lined up in front of the Chieftains table and Jouko Ahola, the then current World Strongest Man was given the title of honorary chieftain. He was dressed in a kilt and officially started the Games by banging the sword on the shield to the four winds.

By the late 1990s, although regarded highly still, the WMPC profile appeared to dip. In 1998 for example it was advertised that the winner was guaranteed a place at the World's Strongest Man competition, whereas in the 1980s and early 90s it was much more than a qualifier for the more prestigious competition, but a second world title. The profile of strength athletics in general waned in the late 1990s with less coverage on television and many events suffered, including WMPC. In 2000 there was no event held. However, in 2001 it returned. At this time a Strongman Super Series had emerged, an attempt to heighten the profile of the sport once more, and although the WMPC did not feature as part of the point scoring events on that tour, it was advertised as the Scottish Grand Prix. In 2002, the WMPC, also referred to as the Aberdeen Grand Prix, was part of the Strongman Super Series in that year. Although still known as the WMPC, being part of a Super Series was a far cry from its grander position in the 1980s and 1990s. It fell from the list of Super Series events in 2003, and no event was planned in Scotland. At this time, the town of Dolbeau-Mistassini, Quebec stepped in. Here, a reputation had been building for a number of years as a host venue for quality strength athletics and they jumped at the chance of hosting a reinvigorated WMPC. It lasted for two years in this venue but 2004 was its last outing. At this juncture the world of strength athletics had been damaged by the split between IFSA and the World's Strongest Man with more than one organisation claiming to be the only official worldwide body. An unfortunate casualty of the rift was the WMPC. It is notable that the five time WSM champion Mariusz Pudzianowski, was never able to capture the WMPC title.

Events
Events were held over two days, and over the years the events changed although popular events included:

The wench.
The Tree Trunk Lift
The McGlashen stones
The log press
The Basque circle
The Anvil Hold
The super yoke
The Carry and Waddle

Results

 (except for third place in 2001 from )

See also
List of strongman competitions

References

Strongmen competitions